The English sole (Parophrys vetulus) is a flatfish of the family Pleuronectidae. Its native habitat is the Eastern Pacific, stretching from the coast of Baja California in the south to the Bering Sea in the north.

English sole is an important commercial fish, primarily caught off Washington, Oregon and California. Though biomass is increasing, catches have been declining since the 1960s and are currently almost at an all-time low.

The English sole is known in Spanish as platija limón, or lemon sole, a name by which it is also known in English, though the true lemon sole is a separate species, Microstomus kitt.

Etymology

The genus name is derived from the Greek para, meaning "near", ophrys, meaning "eyebrow", and the species name vetulus is a word meaning "old man".

Description

The English sole is a right-eyed flatfish with a compressed, diamond-shaped body and a small head with a pointed snout and small, asymmetric mouth. The upper surface is covered in rough scales and is usually uniformly brown, but occasionally speckled; the lower surface is smooth, and white to pale yellow in colour. The dorsal and ventral fin edges are dark. The lateral line is mostly straight, but curves slightly around the pectoral fin.

Diet

The English sole's diet consists of zoobenthos organisms, primarily marine worms, molluscs, crustaceans and echinoderms. English sole feed by day, using both sight and smell, and often dig for food.

Commercial fishing

The English sole is an important commercial fish, and has been fished in the Eastern Pacific, almost exclusively by trawler, since 1876. Two fisheries exist: one on the West Coast of the United States, off Washington, Oregon and California, and one in the Bering Sea off Alaska. The majority of English sole landed is from the West Coast fishery.

Although biomass is increasing, catches have been steadily decreasing since the 1960s — though catches peaked in the southern area in 1929 with  landed, and in the north in 1949 at  — and have today almost reached a historical low. This decline is estimated to be due to a combination of market factors and management restrictions placed on fishing trawlers in order to protect other bottom-dwelling species.

References

English sole
Western North American coastal fauna
English sole
English sole